Thorn Kief Hillsbery is an American novelist. He is the author of War Boy and What We Do Is Secret, which was nominated for a Lambda Literary Award. He was born in Portland, Oregon, and attended Evergreen State College. He currently lives in Manhattan, and teaches a creative writing workshop at Columbia University.

He is openly gay.

Bibliography
 War Boy, Rob Weisbach Books, 2000. 
 What We Do Is Secret, Villard, 2005. 
 Empire Made,  Houghton Mifflin Harcourt, 2012. (in press)

References

External links
 the author's website

People from Manhattan
Living people
Year of birth missing (living people)
Evergreen State College alumni
Columbia University faculty
21st-century American novelists
American male novelists
American gay writers
American LGBT novelists
21st-century American male writers
Novelists from New York (state)